Babacar Ba  (June 14, 1930 – December 13, 2006) was a Senegalese  politician from Kaolack. He served as Minister of Finance and Economy from 1971 to 1978, when Ousmane Seck took office. Ba was named Foreign Minister of Senegal. He stepped down as from the foreign ministry later that same year, and was succeeded by Moustapha Niasse.

References

Babacar Ndiaye et Waly Ndiaye, Présidents et ministres de la République du Sénégal, Dakar, 2006 (2e éd.), p. 52

1930 births
2006 deaths
Finance ministers of Senegal
Foreign ministers of Senegal
Economy ministers of Senegal
People from Kaolack